The Ellicott City Granodiorite is a Silurian or Ordovician granitic pluton in Howard and Baltimore Counties, Maryland. It is described as a biotite granodiorite along the margin of the intrusion which grades into a quartz monzonite in its core. It intrudes through the Wissahickon Formation and the Baltimore Gabbro Complex.  

In 1964, C. A. Hopson grouped the Ellicott City Granodiorite with the Guilford Quartz Monzonite and the Woodstock Quartz Monzonite as "Late-kinematic intrusive masses."

In 1980, Crowley and Reinhardt of the Maryland Geological Survey remapped the Ellicott City Quadrangle and referred to this unit as the Ellicott City Granite, rather than granodiorite.

Description
Hopson reported the chemical composition (by %) of the Elicott City Granodiorite from two locations.  H7-A is on River Road, 0.3 miles east of the Patapsco River Bridge, Ellicott City, and H18-1A is on U.S. Route 29, 200 yards south of U.S. Route 40.

Early quarrying

The 1898 account of Edward B. Mathews of the Maryland Geological Survey of the quarries at Ellicott City begins with a statement that there were two quarries; one on either side of the Patapsco River. The rock on the eastern, or Baltimore County, side is "a fine grained mass, with a decided foliation or gneissic structure," while the rock on the western, or Howard County side, is "more uniform and granitic." The text also refers to the figure of the polished slab on the left: "Here it also has a porphyritic structure in consequence of the development of large flesh-colored crystals of feldspar which are disseminated somewhat irregularly through the rock, as shown in (the figure)."   
Mathews continued with a description of their historical importance:

Mathews described recent (c. 1872-1898) operations at the quarries:

Age
In 1973, M. W. Higgins reported a radiometric (Rb-Sr age) of 425 Ma, which placed the Ellicott City Granodiorite in the Silurian.  In 1998, A. A. Drake revised the age to Ordovician based on the granodiorite's relationship with the Woodstock Quartz Monzonite.

See also
 Guilford Quartz Monzonite
 Oella Formation

References

Baltimore County, Maryland
Howard County, Maryland
Granitic rocks
Igneous petrology of Maryland
Ordovician magmatism